Stålstuten Ridge is a high ridge extending from the northeast side of Mount Hochlin, in the Muhlig-Hofmann Mountains of Queen Maud Land. Mapped by Norwegian cartographers from surveys and air photos by the Norwegian Antarctic Expedition (1956–60) and named Stålstuten (the bulldozer).

Ridges of Queen Maud Land
Princess Martha Coast